Son is a hamlet located in the municipality of Alt Àneu, in Province of Lleida province, Catalonia, Spain. As of 2020, it has a population of 44.

Geography 
Son is located 169km north-northeast of Lleida.

References

Populated places in the Province of Lleida